Thlaspi alpestre is a species of flowering plant belonging to the family Brassicaceae.

Synonyms:
 Noccaea alpestris (Jacq.) Kerguélen
 Noccaea crantzii F.K.Mey.
 Thlaspi alpinum (Crantz) Crantz
 Thlaspi alpinum var. alpinum
 Thlaspi alpinum subsp. alpinum
 Thlaspi montanum var. alpinum Crantz

References

Brassicaceae